Sanjay Raman is an electrical engineer. He is a professor of electrical and computer engineering at Virginia Tech, where he is also associate vice president of Virginia Tech in the National Capital Region. He was named a Fellow of the Institute of Electrical and Electronics Engineers (IEEE) in 2013 for his work on adaptive microwave and millimeter-wave integrated circuits.

References

External links

Fellow Members of the IEEE
Living people
Virginia Tech faculty
Year of birth missing (living people)
American electrical engineers